Komoni (also Romanized as Komonī and Kamnī; also known as Kumani) is a village in Pir Kuh Rural District, Deylaman District, Siahkal County, Gilan Province, Iran. At the 2006 census, its population was 192, in 50 families.

References 

Populated places in Siahkal County